ARD-aktuell has been the central television newsroom of the ARD since 1977.

ARD-aktuell is a jointed institution of the ARD. It is located at the NDR (Norddeutscher Rundfunk) in Hamburg-Lokstedt. The basis of the work of ARD-aktuell is an administrative agreement of all nine ARD institutions, in which the organization of the editorial office and the basic structure of the programs are defined.

ARD-aktuell produces Tagesschau, Tagesthemen, Nachtmagazin and the news broadcast of the television channel tagesschau24. All formats are broadcast live. At ARD-aktuell, about 300 employees work in editorial and production. The editorial board is divided into two major areas: a planning team develops the program ideas and organizes contributions and live connections. The broadcasting team is responsible for the content of the broadcasts.

Editors of ARD-aktuell
Since October 2019 Marcus Bornheim is the chief editor of the newsroom, which must be elected by the ARD directors with a two-thirds majority.

References

External links
 

ARD (broadcaster)
Mass media in Hamburg